Skylanders: Trap Team is a 2014
3D platform game developed by Toys for Bob and Beenox and published by Activision. It is the fourth installment in the Skylanders video game franchise and was released on October 2, 2014, in Australasia, October 5, 2014 in North America, and October 10, 2014, in Europe, for release on Android and iOS mobile platforms, PlayStation 3, PlayStation 4, Wii, Wii U, Xbox 360, Xbox One, and Nintendo 3DS. It is the sequel to Skylanders: Swap Force, with the voices of Fred Tatasciore, Billy West, John DiMaggio, Matthew Moy, Laura Bailey, Alex Ness, John Paul Karliak, Matthew Yang King, and Richard Horvitz.

Skylanders: Trap Team utilizes a near-field communication reader platform, called the Traptanium Portal, that reads NFC chips located on the bottom of figurines. The figurines are then used in-game as playable characters. Later figurines named "Trap Masters", working with the Portal Master, must try to capture all criminals that Kaos has released from Cloudcracker Prison, which held the most feared villains of Skylands.

A sequel to Trap Team, Skylanders: SuperChargers, was released in September 2015.

Synopsis 
Kaos has blown up Cloudcracker Prison, freeing The Doom Raiders, the most notorious villains in Skylands, led by the Golden Queen and her cohorts: The Gulper, Chompy Mage, Chef Pepper Jack, Dreamcatcher, Dr. Krankcase and Wolfgang. Now it's up to Snap Shot, Wallop, Jawbreaker, Wildfire, Gearshift, Krypt King, Gusto, Lob Star, Bushwhack, Head Rush, Ka-Boom, Blastermind, Tuff Luck, Thunderbolt, Short Cut, Enigma, Knight Light, Knight Mare, and the rest of the gang to find and capture them. Using Traptanium, a magic material that can harness the power of the elements, they now have the amazing ability to trap the villains and return them to Skylands to fight for them. The Trap Team must begin the ultimate adventure as they explore the world of Skylands in search of the escaped villains. Because of the aforementioned blowing up of Cloudcracker Prison, two new elements were created. These elements were light, and dark.

Plot 
The goal of the game is to capture the villains who have escaped from jail. Long ago, Skylands was ruled by powerful villains called the Doom Raiders who hid out in the Savage Badlands and wreaked havoc over Skylands. They were eventually captured by a group of elite Skylanders called: The Trap Team and were placed in Cloudcracker Prison. Some years later, Kaos, the game's main antagonist, released The Doom Raiders and the other villains by blowing up the prison. As a result, the Trap Team were sent to earth along with crystal traps formed by a material of the prison called Traptanium. During the opening of Skylanders Academy presented by Buzz a remnant of the explosion is seen, and he goes to investigate. Buzz helps the Trap Team catch the Gluper, a giant blob monster, at Soda Springs by using  its addiction to soda. Meanwhile, Kaos gathers with the Doom Raiders at his new lair but the Doom Raiders reject him without even listening to his plan due to him failing to stop the Trap Team from recapturing the Gulper. The Doom Raiders leader, The Golden Queen, lets Kaos and his troll butler Glumshanks stay only to come up with a plan of her own. The Trap Team secure intelligence about the Doom Raiders at Know-It-all Island then head to Chompy Mountain, where they battle Chompy Mage and his forces and trap him. Meanwhile, Golden Queen learns of the defeat, with Kaos deciding to take advantage of this to retake control.

The Trap Team are sent to track down Chef Pepper Jack and stop him from stealing the Phoenix Chicken. They hold off the Chef's forces from obtaining an egg to create a Spicy Omelet of Doom. Kaos intervenes to foil his plans but his smoke rocket lets Chef Pepper Jack run away with an egg.  Launching an assault on his Zeppelin, The Trap Team trap Chef Pepper Jack. With 3 Doom Raiders down, the remaining Doom Raiders are set to take action, but Golden Queen still wants to build a weapon made of Traptanium in an attempt to get all the gold in Skylands much to Kaos' dismay. He tries to get control but loses and he is given the boot. Realizing he will need the help of The Skylanders, Kaos decides to aid them to get revenge, revealing that the Dreamcatcher (a sadistic yet immature floating head able to manipulate dreams and bring nightmares to life) has been terrorizing a Mabu village in Monster Marsh. They are able to stop her by waking the sleeping townspeople, but she escapes. The Trap Team head to Telescope Towers to prevent her from stealing secrets of Traptanium from the dreams of Mabu scientists, eventually defeating and trapping her though she manages to send the secrets to the Doom Raiders.

Though the secrets were lost, Dr Krankcase, a mad scientist specializing in animating wood into evil robotic minions made of wood, still needs one final piece to the weapon: a large amount of "stinkocity", or bad odor. While The Trap Team manage to stop the main flow of smelly goo, Dr. Krankcase substitutes the goo for cheese, and comes up with a plan to simply bury it and travel forward in time to when it will be unbearable in stench, though this requires a Portal Master. To do so, they reopen Kaos's Wilikin workshop and trap him, but Wolfgang, a rockstar wolf armed with a massive bone harp, abandons Krankcase and leaves him to be trapped by The Trap Team. They track Wolfgang to Time Town, but they arrive too late as Wolfgang has already headed to the far future. Arriving in that time period, they discover that he has completely taken over and constructed "The Big Bad Wolfer", a giant head that amplifies his painful music 10-fold. The Trap Team make their way to the Big Bad Wolfer and shut it down, and defeat Wolfgang. However, the rotten cheese was sent to Golden Queen in the present, and she completes the weapon. She demands her fellow Doom Raiders to be freed, the Trap Team to surrender, and to have all the gold in the world.

The Trap Team and their friends steal a rocket from the Trolls and use it to get to the Skyhighlands, where they find a crystal to locate the Golden Queen's lair. The Trap Team defeat Golden Queen. However, Kaos takes the weapon for himself and absorbs the combined stinkocity and energy from the collected Traptanium, to become much stronger. He then realizes it was not The Skylanders he had to destroy, but the one thing that was always in his way: The Portal Masters, or the player, and sets his eyes on Earth. With both worlds hanging in the balance, The Trap Team make their way through the weapon and battle Kaos who transforms into an enhanced Traptainium version of himself, growing Traptanium swords and raven-like wings. In spite of this, Kaos is finally defeated and put in a Kaos trap. The weapon then overloads and explodes, freeing the trapped cities. The game ends with Buzz and Flynn announcing the official opening of the Skylander Academy.

Gameplay 
As in previous games, the player controls a variety of characters by placing toy figures representing the characters onto a near field communication-enabled interface device known as the Traptanium Portal, which activates the character in the game. 
In Trap Team, however, a new item type has been added: the trap. Unlike the figures, which bring characters into the game, the traps can be used to store forty-seven enemy characters originally found in the game (including Kaos), who may then be controlled as good characters. These stored characters can be taken to other consoles. The Traptanium Portal has a speaker incorporated in its design, to emphasize the trapping mechanic. When enemies are "trapped", their vocals travel from a screen to the portal. Skystones Smash, a mini-game and successor to Skystones from Skylanders: Giants has been added. Skystones Smash is a card game, that uses numbers and is played in a tabletop style which is also included in the game.

Trap Masters are introduced in Trap Team and are special Skylanders that are stronger against trappable villains. The game also establishes Skylanders Minis (miniature versions of regular Skylanders) as playable characters. Players can switch between playing as a villain and a Skylander at any point in the game. In co-operative play players can share the trapped villain, and take turns playing as it. However, a time limit is given to how long a villain can be used. Once the playable villain's energy is depleted, players must wait until the villain's energy can recharge before using the character once more. Villains are actually more powerful than Skylanders. There are also hidden quests involving villains, once completed each quest unlocks exclusive upgrades. Villains can also be stored in the Villain Vault which is located in the game's hub world.

The mobile version of Trap Team uses a bluetooth Traptanium Portal and optional touch controls. If the Traptanium Portal is not connected, players can use "on the go characters", digital versions of the figurines stored on the device.

New elements have been added to the classic eight. These new elements have later become known as Light and Dark; however there are only two Skylanders in each. These Skylanders are Knight Light, Spotlight, Knight Mare and Blackout. Areas only accessible by Skylanders of these elements, as well as Villains of these elements are labeled to be of an "Unknown Element" and cannot be visited or trapped, respectively, until a Light or Dark Skylander is placed on the Portal of Power.

Skylanders: Trap Team characters 

Skylanders: Trap Team introduces 18 new Trap Master Skylanders, 18 new core Skylanders, 40+ trappable villains, and sixteen new mini Skylanders. It also includes five reposed core Skylanders from previous games, and 8 Eon's Elite Skylanders with shiny finishes.

Development 
On April 23, 2014, Activision announced Skylanders: Trap Team with a release on October 5, 2014.

Release 
Skylanders: Trap Team was released on October 2, 2014, in Australia, October 5, 2014 in North America, and October 10, 2014, in Europe, for release on Android, iOS, PlayStation 3, PlayStation 4, Wii, Wii U, Xbox 360, Xbox One and Nintendo 3DS.

In addition to the regular Starter Pack released for all gaming consoles (which includes Food Fight and Snap Shot, two Traps, sticker sheets and trading cards), a Dark Edition Starter Pack was also released, and included the Ultimate Kaos Trap, a dark version of Snap Shot, Dark Wildfire, Dark Food Fight, a two-sided collector's poster, sticker sheets, two additional traps, and trading cards.

The Nintendo 3DS Starter Pack came with Gusto and Barkley, without any traps, as the trapping mechanic is integrated differently.

The Tablet Starter Pack, for Android and iOS devices, comes with a Bluetooth Traptanium Portal, a controller and everything that is included in the Starter Pack from game consoles.

The Wii version contains a free download code for the Wii U version of the game, which is not available on the Nintendo eShop otherwise.

Reception 

Skylanders: Trap Team received "generally favorable" reviews for most platforms according to review aggregator Metacritic; the iOS version received "universal acclaim".

References

External links 
 
 

2014 video games
3D platform games
Activision games
Android (operating system) games
Beenox games
Cooperative video games
Dinosaurs in video games
IOS games
Multiplayer and single-player video games
Nintendo 3DS games
Nintendo Network games
PlayStation 3 games
PlayStation 4 games
Role-playing video games
Science fantasy video games
Trap Team
Superhero video games
Toys for Bob games
Toys-to-life games
Vicarious Visions games
Video game sequels
Video games scored by Lorne Balfe
Wii games
Wii U games
Xbox 360 games
Xbox One games
Video games developed in the United States